Sanjana Sanghi (born 2 September 1996) is an Indian actress and model who mainly works in Hindi films. She made her acting debut as a child artist in the 2011 film Rockstar. She later appeared in cameo roles in Hindi Medium and Fukrey Returns.

Sanghi is most known for her first lead role in the Sushant Singh Rajput starrer Dil Bechara where she was seen as a terminal cancer patient.

Early life 
Sanjana Sanghi was born on 2 September 1996 in Delhi, India to businessman Sandeep Sanghi and homemaker Shagun. She has a brother, Sumer. She studied at Modern School in Delhi and then completed her graduation in Journalism and Mass communication from Lady Shri Ram College, Delhi in 2017.

Career 

Sanghi made her acting debut in Imtiaz Ali's romantic drama film Rockstar in 2011. She was cast by Mukesh Chhabra after he saw her performing on stage at her school. In 2016, she played student in Jai's classroom in Baar Baar Dekho. In 2017, she played Katty in Fukrey Returns and the younger role of Saba Qamar in Hindi Medium. 

In 2018, she was chosen as the female lead for Dil Bechara, starring alongside Sushant Singh Rajput in the adaptation of The Fault in Our Stars. The film released in 2020 on Disney+Hotstar. In 2021, she appeared in Guru Randhawa's music video 'Mehendi Wale Haath'.

Sanghi next featured in Kapil Verma's action drama Rashtra Kavach Om alongside Aditya Roy Kapur. The movie was released in July 2022. She will also appear as the lead in Dinesh Vijan's Munjha and will be seen in the road trip film Dhak Dhak.

Other work
Sanghi has also appeared in advertisements for companies like Tanishq, Cadbury, Aircel, Coca-Cola, Myntra and Dabur.

Filmography

Films

Music videos

References

External links 

 
 

1996 births
Living people
Actresses from Delhi
Indian film actresses
Lady Shri Ram College alumni